Pavlo 'Pasha' Romanovych Lee (10 July 1988 – 6 March 2022) was a Ukrainian actor and television presenter.

Early life 
Lee was born in Yevpatoria, Crimea, to a Koryo-saram father and a Ukrainian mother. He also went by a variant spelling of his surname, Li.

Career 
Lee was a television host for the Dom Channel. He had worked in theatre and a number of commercials, and was known for starring in the films Tini nezabutykh predkiv. Tayemnytsi molfara (2013), Shtolnya (2006), Pravilo boya (2017), Zustrich odnoklasnykiv (2019), and the voice dubbing of the popular English-language films The Lion King, Yesterday, BIOS and The Hobbit into Ukrainian; he was also the dubbing voice of television characters such as Eric Cartman in South Park, Steve Smith in American Dad!, Glenn Quagmire in Family Guy and Psyduck in Detective Pikachu. Most recently, he starred in the TV series Provincial (2021).

Filmography 
 2003 - One for All
 2006 - Bottom asleep - Dan
 2008 - Thanks for Everything You've Been Thanking Me-3
 2012 - Common Law
 2013 - The Legacy of Forgotten Ancestors - Vova
 2016 - Selfie Party - Guardian
 2017 - Fighting Rule - Diesel
 2017 - Specifics
 2019 - Meeting of Classmates - Kostya
 2022 - Mirny-21 (in the works)[7]

Death 
Lee enlisted in the Territorial Defense Forces of Ukraine on the first day of the Russian invasion. During his time fighting, he had posted several times to his Instagram account discussing the conditions and Ukrainian strength.

He was killed by Russian shelling in the Battle of Irpin on 6 March, and his death was announced by the Odesa International Film Festival. He was buried on 18 March in Vorokhta, Ivano-Frankivsk Oblast, where his mother still lives.

References 

1988 births
2022 deaths
Koryo-saram
People from Yevpatoria
Ukrainian male film actors
Ukrainian male voice actors
Ukrainian military personnel killed in the 2022 Russian invasion of Ukraine
Territorial Defense Forces of Ukraine personnel
Ukrainian people of Korean descent